Climate Emergency Action Alliance: Vote Planet, formerly the Save Our One Planet Alliance, is an Australian political party founded in 2019. The party is an electoral alliance between the unregistered "Save the Planet" and "One Planet" parties. "Save Our One Planet Alliance" changed its name in 2021 to the "Climate Emergency Alliance: Vote Planet".

Save the Planet was formed in 2012, and several of its members have contested Victorian state elections in the electorates of Brunswick and Northcote.

The party's policies primarily focus around issues surrounding climate change, such as reducing greenhouse gas emissions and preparing for a post-climate change planet.

In early 2022, it merged with other parties to become the Fusion Party.

Electoral history

Federal

Victoria

Darebin

See also

 List of political parties in Australia

Notes

References

Political parties in Australia
Political parties established in 2019
2019 establishments in Australia
Climate change organisations based in Australia